Negros is an island in the Philippines.

Negros may also refer to:

Places

Philippines
Current entities
 Negros Occidental, a current province of the Philippines
 Negros Oriental, a current province of the Philippines

Former entities
 Negros (province), a former province 1865–1890
 Negros Island Region, a short-lived administrative region 2015–2017 
 Negros del Norte, a short-lived province of the Philippines in 1986
 Republic of Negros, a short-lived revolutionary entity 1898–1901

Other countries
 Negros, Corozal, Puerto Rico
 Negros, Redondela, Spain
 Los Negros Island, Papua New Guinea

Other uses
 a plural of Negro
 Negros Navigation, a domestic shipping company in the Philippines
 Los Negros, a criminal organization in Mexico

See also

 Negro (disambiguation)